Zodarion pirini is a spider species found in Bulgaria and Greece.

See also 
 List of Zodariidae species

References

External links 

pirini
Spiders of Europe
Spiders described in 1921
Taxa named by Pencho Drensky